GTP may refer to:

Computing 
 Go Text Protocol
 GPRS Tunnelling Protocol
 .gtp, a common Gerber file extension for top solder paste mask files

Government 
 Government Transformation Programme (Malaysia)
 Graduate Teacher Programme, in England and Wales
 Growth and Transformation Plan of the Government of Ethiopia

Medicine and science 
 Guanosine triphosphate
 Good tissue practice
 Global Temperature change Potential

Vehicles, Transport, Motorsport 
 Grand Touring Prototype; the IMSA GTP, a race car category
 1st generation(1981–1993), see IMSA GT Championship
 BMW GTP
 Chevrolet Corvette GTP
 Consulier GTP
 Ford Mustang GTP
 Mazda GTP
 2nd generation(2023–), see Le Mans Hypercar or LMDh
 Grand Trunk Pacific Railway, a defunct Canadian railway
 Pontiac Grand Prix GTP
 Pontiac G6 GTP
 Sisu GTP, a Finnish military vehicle

Other uses 
 Global TransPark, in North Carolina, United States
 Global Tower Partners, an American telecommunications company

See also 

 
 GTP' (GTP Prime), a network protocol based on GPRS Tunnelling Protocol (GTP)